The Verstancla Glacier is a 2 km long glacier (2005) situated in the Silvretta Range in the canton of Graubünden in Switzerland. In 1973 it had an area of 1.27 km2. The glacier is located north of the Verstanclahorn. It is parallel to the larger Silvretta Glacier lying a few kilometres north.

The Verstancla Glacier gives birth to the river Verstanclabach which ends in the river Landquart.

See also
List of glaciers in Switzerland
Swiss Alps

External links
Swiss glacier monitoring network

Glaciers of Graubünden